Open Mainframe Project is a Collaborative Project managed by the Linux Foundation to encourage the use of Linux-based operating systems and open source software on mainframe computers. The project was announced on August 17, 2015 and was driven by IBM, a major supplier of mainframe hardware, as well as 16 other founding members, that included SUSE, CA Technologies, BMC Software, Compuware as well as clients and partners such as RSM Partner, Vicom Infinity, L3C LLP and ADP, and academic institutions such as Marist College and University of Bedfordshire. Coincident with the announcement, IBM also announced a partnership with Canonical to make the Ubuntu operating system available for their high-end z Systems hardware.

Development priorities for the project in 2016 include OpenJDK, Docker and Hyperledger.

In February 2016 the Linux Foundation announced new members had joined the Open Mainframe Project: Hitachi Data Systems, Sine Nomine Associates, East Carolina University and DataKinetics, a 35% expansion in the overall membership. Canonical, the organization behind Ubuntu, has also joined. Part of the announcement was the launch of a summer intern program.

Projects

Zowe 
Zowe is the first open source project for z/OS. It was announced in August 2018 at SHARE in St. Louis together with the open beta release of version 0.9 that contained contributions from IBM, Computer Associates, and Rocket Software. Version 1.0 was released in February 2019. In September 2019 Phoenix Software International obtained Zowe conformance for their (E)JES Command Line Interface plugins and REST API extension.

It narrows the skills gap between new and legacy z/OS developers by offering the choice to work with z/OS either through a Command Line Interface, a "Zowe Explorer" Visual Studio extension, a web browser served from the Zowe Application Framework, or through REST APIs and web sockets served through the API Mediation Layer. Zowe is an extensible platform for tools, and provides the ability for extension through CLI plugins, new applications to be added to the web desktop, and onboarding of REST APIs to the API Mediation Layer.

The Zowe conformance program provides certification accreditation to Independent Software Vendors (ISVs) and System Integrators (SIs) building and distributing Zowe extensions.

See also 
 Linux on IBM Z

References

External links 
 

Linux Foundation projects
IBM